The Ubangi River, also spelled Oubangui, is the largest right-bank tributary of the Congo River in the region of Central Africa. It begins at the confluence of the Mbomou (mean annual discharge 1,350 m3/s) and Uele Rivers (mean annual discharge 1,550 m3/s) and flows west, forming the border between Central African Republic (CAR) and Democratic Republic of the Congo. Subsequently, the Ubangi bends to the southwest and passes through Bangui, the capital of the CAR, after which it flows southforming the border between Democratic Republic of the Congo and Republic of the Congo. The Ubangi finally joins the Congo River at Liranga.

Mean annual discharge at mouth 5,936 m3/s. It is believed that the Ubangi's upper reaches originally flowed into the Chari River and Lake Chad before being captured by the Congo in the early Pleistocene.

Together with the Congo River, it provides an important transport artery for river boats between Bangui and Brazzaville. Thereafter, it forms the boundary between the DRC and the Republic of Congo until it empties into the Congo River.

Lake Chad replenishment project 

In the 1960s, a plan was proposed to divert waters from the Ubangi to the Chari River. According to the plan, named Transaqua, the water from the Ubangi would revitalize Lake Chad and provide a livelihood in fishing and enhanced agriculture to tens of millions of central Africans and Sahelians. Inter-basin water transfer schemes were proposed in the 1980s and 1990s by Nigerian engineer J.Umolu and the Italian firm Bonifica. 

In 1994, the Lake Chad Basin Commission (LCBC) proposed a similar project, and at a March 2008 summit the heads of state of the LCBC member countries committed to the diversion project. In April 2008, the LCBC advertised a request for proposals for a feasibility study.

References

External links 
 Map showing the Ubangi Subbasin at World Resources Institute
 International Commission of the Congo-Oubangui-Sangha Bassin

 
Central African Republic–Democratic Republic of the Congo border
Democratic Republic of the Congo–Republic of the Congo border
International rivers of Africa
Border rivers
Rivers of the Central African Republic
Rivers of the Democratic Republic of the Congo
Rivers of the Republic of the Congo
Tributaries of the Congo River